The following are lists of episodes from the Cosmos series:

 List of Cosmos: A Personal Voyage episodes, which first aired in 1980.
 List of Cosmos: A Spacetime Odyssey episodes, which first aired in 2014.
 List of Cosmos: Possible Worlds episodes, which first aired in 2020.